The Labour functional constituency is a functional constituency in the elections for the Legislative Council of Hong Kong. It was one of the 12 functional constituency seats created for the 1985 Legislative Council election. It corresponds to the Labour Subsector in the Election Committee. The constituency is composed of 697 bodies that are trade unions of which all the voting members are employees.

The constituency composed of two seats when it first created by in 1985 as two of the 12 original functional constituency seats. It was held by the two largest labour unions at that time, the pro-Communist Hong Kong Federation of Trade Unions (FTU) and pro-Nationalist Hong Kong and Kowloon Trades Union Council (TUC). Since 1998, the constituency composed of three seats, two occupied by the FTU and one occupied by the Federation of Hong Kong and Kowloon Labour Unions (FLU), both pro-Beijing.

Return members

1985–1997 (2 seats)

1998–present (3 seats)

Electoral results
The plurality-at-large voting system is used and the elected candidates are shown in bold.

2020s

2010s

2000s

1990s

1980s

References

Constituencies of Hong Kong
Constituencies of Hong Kong Legislative Council
Functional constituencies (Hong Kong)
1985 establishments in Hong Kong
Constituencies established in 1985